Matanzas is the capital city of the Cuban province of Matanzas.

Matanzas may also refer to:

Geography
 Matanzas Province, Cuba
 Matanzas, Chile, a village in Chile
 Matanzas, Dominican Republic
 Fort Matanzas National Monument in Florida
 Matanzas River in Florida
 Matanzas Inlet in Florida
 Matanzas Creek in California

Other uses
 Matanzas (baseball), a Cuban professional baseball team
 USS Matanzas (AVP-46), a United States Navy seaplane tender which was cancelled in 1943 before construction could begin

See also
 Matanza (disambiguation)

eo:Matanzas